Quinahue is a village located in the Chilean commune of Santa Cruz, Colchagua province. It used to be an independent commune, until it was annexed to Santa Cruz in 1927, by Decree of President Carlos Ibáñez del Campo.

References 

Populated places in Colchagua Province